Kinkora may refer to:
Kinkora, Prince Edward Island, Canada
Kinkora Regional High School
Kinkora, New Jersey
Kinkora (crater)
Kinkora-Pemberton rail-trail

See also
Borden-Kinkora